Blau (stylized as BLAU) is the debut studio album by Japanese singer Eir Aoi. It was released under SME Records on January 30, 2013. It debuted at number four on Oricon chart, and reached number three on Billboard Japan Top Albums Sales. Blau takes its title from German word meaning "blue", denoting her image color and thought that "I want you to feel a variety of Eir Aoi". Three singles were released from the album: "Memoria", "Aurora", and "Innocence", all of them were used for anime theme songs. "Memoria" was chosen as Fate/Zero 's first ending theme, "Aurora" as Mobile Suit Gundam AGE 's fourth opening theme, and  "Innocence" as Sword Art Online 's second opening theme. "Memoria" and "Innocence" were most successful songs of the album, have been certified Gold by the RIAJ for sales in Japan, with over 100,000 copies sold for each.

Track listing

Charts

Album

Singles

References

External links
 

Eir Aoi albums
2013 debut albums
SME Records albums